Teemu Lämsä (born 6 February 1996) is a Finnish ice hockey player. He is currently playing with HC TPS in the Finnish Liiga.

Lämsä made his Liiga debut playing with HC TPS during the 2013–14 Liiga season.

References

External links

1996 births
Living people
Finnish ice hockey forwards
HC TPS players
Sportspeople from Turku
SaiPa players